Dread is a 2009 British horror film directed and written by Anthony DiBlasi and starring Jackson Rathbone, Shaun Evans and Hanne Steen, based on the short story of the same name by Clive Barker. The story was originally published in 1984 in volume two of Barker's Books of Blood short story collections.

Plot
At a small college, Quaid and his friend Stephen do a "fear study" as a school project, recording people talking about their greatest fears. Quaid, however, is quite psychopathic and wants to take the fear to 'the next level'. Quaid had seen his parents killed by an axe murderer as a child; this is his greatest fear, and he wants to learn what others dread and how they deal with it, in order to find a way to defy his own dread. Stephen's brother had died while drunk-driving, and Stephen wonders if his brother would still be alive if he had driven instead.

Cheryl, who is the project's editor, was molested by her father as a little girl. He worked at a meat-packing plant and smelled of meat while molesting her; to this day, she can't stand the smell of meat and refuses to eat it. Quaid kidnaps her and locks her in a room with a slightly salted, well cooked steak on a plate. After about a week, she finally eats the entire piece of rotten beef. Joshua is a student whose fear is becoming deaf again because he temporarily lost his hearing after a childhood accident. The following night, Quaid knocks him out and fires a gun next to his ears, shattering his eardrums and leaving him deaf again. Abby, another student, has a dark birthmark covering half her face and body, which she doesn't want anyone to see, terrified of being teased or shunned because of it. Quaid sets up video footage of her stripping naked before sex on every TV on campus, showing her naked and covered in birth marks. Humiliated, Abby fills her bathtub with bleach and starts scrubbing off her skin with steel wool. Stephen finds her naked and bleeding and gets her to the hospital. He then goes after Quaid with a fire axe. Joshua follows him, assuming Stephen and Quaid are working together.

When Stephen confronts Quaid, Stephen is knocked out and awakens tied to a chair. He manages to break free but runs into Joshua, who stabs him with the fire axe. Quaid shoots Joshua, killing him, and watches Stephen die from the axe wound. He drags the body to a room in the basement, where Cheryl is. He throws Stephen's body in along with a switchblade and says, "Let's see how hungry you have to be to get through that." He leaves her crying with Stephen's dead body with only a matter of time before she starts eating his flesh from hunger.

Cast
 Jackson Rathbone as Stephen Grace
 Shaun Evans as Quaid
 Hanne Steen as Cheryl Fromm
 Laura Donnelly as Abby
 Jonathan Readwin as Joshua Shaw
 Paloma Faith as Clara Thornhill
 Siobhan Hewlett as Quaid's mother

Production
The 104 page script was shot in just 28 days. The paintings in the film were created by Nicole Balzarini.

Release
The film had its world premiere at the 2009 Montreal Fantasia Festival, where it picked up a distributor in After Dark Films. It was announced that Dread would be included in the films in the fourth After Dark Horrorfest in 2010. The film was released on 29 January 2010 in US Cinemas.

Reception
Allan Dart of Fangoria called it "a mixed but overall positive" adaptation of Barker's story.  Scott Weinberg of Fearnet called it "a clever balancing act between basic scares, a creepy concept, and something a little more (dare I say) cerebral."  Paul McCannibal of Dread Central rated it 4/5 stars and called it "a well made adaptation of the short story" that "is well worth your time."  Dennis Harvey of Variety said that the film "intrigues, even if it doesn’t entirely satisfy".  Noel Murray of The A.V. Club called it "overwritten and more than a little pretentious".  Brett Cullum of DVD Verdict called it a good Barker adaptation that is "certainly worth checking out".  Ian Jane of DVD Talk rated it 3.5/5 stars and called it "a nasty, twisted little thriller that features some good performances and stand out set pieces that help you look past its low budget."

References

External links
 
 

2009 films
2009 horror films
Films based on short fiction
Films based on works by Clive Barker
British horror films
British psychological horror films
British exploitation films
British splatter films
2000s English-language films
2000s British films